The 2008 Western Carolina Catamounts team represented Western Carolina University as a member of the Southern Conference (SoCon) during the 2008 NCAA Division I FCS football season. Led by first-year head coach Dennis Wagner, the Catamounts compiled an overall record of 3–9 with a mark of 1–7 in conference play, placing eighth in the SoCon. Western Carolina played their home games at Bob Waters Field at E. J. Whitmire Stadium in Cullowhee, North Carolina.

Schedule

References

Western Carolina
Western Carolina Catamounts football seasons
Western Carolina Catamounts football